Hervey station or Hervey-Jonction station is a railway station in Hervey-Jonction, Quebec, Canada.

This station was built in  when the National Transcontinental Railway (NTR) transcontinental railway main line was built between (Moncton–) Quebec City to the east and Western Canada to the west at a point where the line crossed the Canadian Northern Railway (CNoR) line from Montreal to the Lac Saint-Jean region. The lines eventually all came to be operated by the Canadian National Railway. Today, the station is where two Via Rail routes travelling together from Montreal (the Montreal–Jonquière train and the Montreal–Senneterre train) stop to perform a split and continue their journey in separate directions. The trains arrive from the south on the former CNoR tracks from Montreal; the train to Jonquière continues northeast along the former CNoR line; and the train to Senneterre heads northwest along the former NTR line. The trains combine here on the way back to Montreal.

The current site of the station is located just opposite the chapel Hervey-Jonction, in the heart of the village since 2007. This section of railway ceased to be used in 2007 after 100 years of use.

The first station was located on the CNoR line at the south of the village of Hervey Junction, near the boundary with Sainte-Thècle.

References

External links

Via Rail stations in Quebec
Railway stations in Canada opened in 1905
Railway stations in Mauricie
1905 establishments in Quebec